Frederick William Rowe (March 19, 1863 – June 20, 1946) was a U.S. Representative from New York.

Biography
Born in Wappingers Falls, New York, Rowe attended the common schools. He was graduated from De Garmo Institute in 1882 and from Colgate University, Hamilton, New York, in 1887. He studied law. He was admitted to the bar in New York City in 1889 and practiced in Brooklyn and New York City until 1904, when he became interested in the development of real estate in Brooklyn. He served as president of several companies, including a street railway company. He served as director of the Dime Savings Bank of Brooklyn.

Rowe was elected as a Republican to the Sixty-fourth, Sixty-fifth, and Sixty-sixth Congresses (March 4, 1915 – March 3, 1921). He was not a candidate for renomination in 1920. He resumed his former business activities in New York City. He died in Rockville Centre, New York on June 20, 1946. He was interred in Green-Wood Cemetery, Brooklyn.

References

External links

 

1863 births
1946 deaths
Colgate University alumni
Burials at Green-Wood Cemetery
Republican Party members of the United States House of Representatives from New York (state)
People from Wappingers Falls, New York